Bismuth oxychloride is an inorganic compound of bismuth with the formula BiOCl. It is a lustrous white solid used since antiquity, notably in ancient Egypt. Light wave interference from its plate-like structure gives a pearly iridescent light reflectivity similar to nacre. It is also known as pearl white.

Structure
These ions are ordered as Cl–Bi–O–Bi–Cl–Cl–Bi–O–Bi–Cl, i.e., with alternating anions and cations. The layered structure gives rise to the pearlescent properties of this material.

Focusing on the coordination environment of the individual ions, the bismuth centers adopt a distorted square antiprismatic coordination geometry. The Bi atom is coordinated to four Cl atoms, forming one of the square faces, each at a distance of 3.06 Å from Bi, and four O atoms forming the other square face, each at a distance of 2.32 Å from Bi. The O atoms are tetrahedrally coordinated by four Bi atoms.

Synthesis and reactions
BiOCl is formed during the reaction of bismuth chloride with water, i.e. the hydrolysis:

Use and occurrence
It has been used in cosmetics since the days of ancient Egypt. It is part of the "pearly pigment found in eye shadow, hair sprays, powders, nail polishes, and other cosmetic products". Owing to the plate-like structure of the BiOCl, its suspensions exhibit optical properties like nacre.
In cosmetic its name is C.I. 77163.

BiOCl exists in nature as the rare mineral bismoclite, which is part of the matlockite mineral group.

An analogous compound, bismuth oxynitrate, is used as a white pigment.

References

Bismuth compounds
Oxychlorides